The state funeral of Talaat Pasha, former Grand Vizier of the Ottoman Empire and one of the chief architects of the Armenian genocide, took place at the Monument of Liberty in Istanbul, Turkey, on 25 February 1943. At the request of the office of the prime minister of Turkey, Şükrü Saracoğlu, Talaat's remains (which had been buried in Berlin since his assassination in 1921) were disinterred and transported to Turkey. The funeral was attended by Prime Minister Saracoğlu, German ambassador to Turkey Franz von Papen, and Turkish journalist Ahmet Emin Yalman. With this gesture, Adolf Hitler hoped to secure Turkish support for the Axis in World War II. Hüseyin Cahit Yalçın gave the funeral oration as Talaat was buried at the monument, originally dedicated to those who lost their lives preventing the 1909 Ottoman countercoup.

Swiss historian Hans-Lukas Kieser has argued that Talaat's reburial symbolized his being "fully rehabilitated and installed as an outstanding and positive figure in public Turkish history". The return of Talaat's body occurred shortly after the 1942 wealth tax intended to financially ruin non-Muslim citizens of Turkey. Turkish writer  condemned the acquittal of Talaat's assassin, Soghomon Tehlirian, but argued Germany made up for this by transporting Talaat's body to Turkey in 1943. Writing in Ulus, journalist Yunus Nadi emphasized continuity and the debt that the republic owed to Talaat's efforts, as well as the legitimacy of the fight against non-Turkish elements. In 1946, Yalçın published Talaat's memoirs, describing him in the preface as "a strong patriot, prepared to sacrifice everything, even his own life, for the salvation and well-being of the fatherland". In the past, commemorative ceremonies were held to honor Talaat at the Monument of Liberty, but this practice has been discontinued .

References

Sources
 
 
 
 
 

Talaat
Talaat Pasha
February 1943 events
1943 in Turkish politics
1940s in Istanbul
Germany–Turkey relations